This is a list of encyclopedias as well as encyclopedic and biographical dictionaries published on the subject of literature in any language.

Entries are in the English language unless specifically stated as otherwise.

General 

Benét, William Rose. Benét's Reader's Encyclopedia. 3rd ed., HarperCollins, 1987.
Boynton, Victoria, Jo Malin, Emmanuel S. Nelson. Encyclopedia of women's autobiography. Greenwood Press, 2005. .

Brewer's Dictionary of 20th-Century Phrase and Fable. Houghton Mifflin, 1992.
Cassell's Encyclopedia of World Literature. Morrow, 1953.

Horn, Maurice. World Encyclopedia of Comics. Chelsea House, 1976.

Kohn, George Childs, Leonard Latkovski. Dictionary of historic documents. Facts on File, 2003. .
Kurian, George Thomas. World Press Encyclopedia. Facts on File, 1982.
Magill, Frank Northen, Tracy Irons-Georges. Cyclopedia of world authors. Salem Press, 2004. .
Martin, Edward A., Peter Froggatt. A biographical encyclopedia of medical travel authors. Edwin Mellen Press, 2010–. .
Miller, Jane Eldridge. Who's who in contemporary women's writing. Routledge, 2002. .
Poggendorff, Johann Christian. J.C. Poggendorffs biographisch-literarisches handwörterbuch zur geschichte der exacten wissenschaften. J.A. Barth, 1863–1995.
Polking, Kirk. Writing A to Z: The Terms, Procedures and Facts of the Writing Business Defined, Explained, and Put Within Reach. Writer's Digest, 1990.

Pribić, Rado. Nobel laureates in literature: A biographical dictionary. Garland, 1990. .

Sabin, Joseph, Wilberforce Eames, R. W. G. Vail Bibliographical Society of America. A dictionary of books relating to America, from its discovery to the present time. Joseph Sabin, 1868–1936.

Sebeok, Thomas A. Encyclopedic Dictionary of Semiotics. Walter de Gruyter, 1986.
Seigneuet, Jean-Charles. Dictionary of Literary Themes and Motifs. Greenwood, 1988.
Sherman, Joseph. Writers in Yiddish. Thomson Gale, 2007. .
Who was who among English and European authors, 1931–1949: Based on entries which first appeared in The author's and writer's who's who and reference guide originally compiled by Edward Martell and L.G. Pine and in Who's who among living authors of older nations, originally compiled by Alberta Lawrence. Gale Research, 1978. .

Religious literature 
Snodgrass, Mary Ellen. Encyclopedia of world scriptures. McFarland, 2001. .

Bible 
Achtemeier, Paul J. Harper's Bible Dictionary. HarperCollins, 1985.
 
Baker Encyclopedia of the Bible. Baker Book House, 1988.
 
 
 
 
 
 
 
 
 
 
 
 
 
 
 
Freedman, Davie Noel. The Anchor Bible Dictionary. Doubleday, 1992.
 
Genz, William. Dictionary of Bible and Religion. Abingdon, 1986.
 
 
 
 
 
 
Holman Bible Dictionary. Holman, 1991.
Illustrated Bible Dictionary. Tyndale House, 1980.
Jeffrey, David Lyle. A Dictionary of Biblical Tradition in English Literature. Eerdmans, 1992.
 
 
 
 
 
 
Metzger, Bruce and Michael D. Coogan. Oxford Companion to the Bible. Oxford University Press, 1993.
Meyers, Allen. Eerdman's Bible Dictionary. Eerdmans, 1987.
 
Mills, Watson. Mercer Dictionary of the Bible. Mercer University Press, 1990.
 
New Unger's Bible Dictionary. rev. ed., Moody, 1988.
 
 
 
 
 
Richards, Lawrence. Revell's Bible Dictionary. Revell, 1990.
 
 
 
 
 
 
 
Zondervan Pictorial Encyclopedia of the Bible. Zondervan, 1974.

Biblical archaeology 
 

 
Stern, Ephraim. The New Encyclopedia of Archaeological Excavations in the Holy Land. rev. ed., Simon & Schuster, 1993.

Quotations 
Ayer, A. J., Jane O'Grady. A dictionary of philosophical quotations. Blackwell Publishers, 1992. .
 
 
Gaither, Carl C., Alma E. Cavazos-Gaither, Andrew Slocombe. Naturally speaking: A dictionary of quotations on biology, botany, nature and zoology. Institute of Physics, 2001. .
Gaither, Carl C., Alma E. Cavazos-Gaither, Andrew Slocombe. Practically speaking: A dictionary of quotations on engineering, technology, and architecture. Institute of Physics, 1999. .
 
Ratcliffe, Susan. People on people: The Oxford dictionary of biographical quotations. Oxford University Press, 2001. .
Wagman, Morton.Historical dictionary of quotations in cognitive science: A treasury of quotations in psychology, philosophy, and artificial intelligence. Greenwood Press, 2000. .

Arabic and Persian

Chinese

French

German

Italian 
 
 
Harbottle, Thomas Benfield. Dictionary of quotations, Italian. Sonnenschein; Macmillan.

Latin and Greek 
 
Harbottle, Thomas Benfield. Dictionary of quotations: Latin. Sonnenschein; Macmillan. 1909.

Spanish

Regional literatures

African literature 
Gomes, Aldónio, Fernanda Cavacas. Dicionário de autores de literaturas africanas de língua portuguesa. Caminho, 1997. . (Portuguese).

American (U.S.) literature 

Bain, Robert, Joseph M. Flora. Contemporary poets, dramatists, essayists, and novelists of the South: a bio-bibliographical sourcebook. Greenwood Press, 1994. .
Bain, Robert, Joseph M. Flora, Louis Decimus Rubin. Southern writers: A biographical dictionary. Louisiana State University Press, 1980. .
Benét, William Rose. Benét's Reader's Encyclopedia. 3rd ed., HarperCollins, 1987.
Bobinski, George S., Jesse Hauk Shera, Bohdan S. Wynar. Dictionary of American library biography. Libraries Unlimited, 1978. .
Brumble, H. David. An annotated bibliography of American Indian and Eskimo autobiographies. University of Nebraska Press, 1981. .
Cambridge Guide to English Literature.Cambridge, 1983.
Davis, Arthur Paul, J. Saunders Redding, Joyce Ann Joyce. The new cavalcade: African American writing from 1760 to the present. Howard University Press, 1991–1992.
Davis, Gwenn, Beverly A. Joyce. Personal writings by women to 1900: A bibliography of American and British writers. University of Oklahoma Press, 1989. .
Drabble, Margaret. The Oxford Companion to English Literature. 5th ed., Oxford, 1985.

Elder, John. American nature writers. Charles Scribner's Sons, 1996. .
Flora, Joseph M., Robert Bain. Fifty Southern writers after 1900: A bio-bibliographical sourcebook. Greenwood Press, 1987. .
Franklin, Benjamin V. Dictionary of American Literary Characters. Facts on File, 1989.
Goulart, Ron. The Encyclopedia of American Comics. Facts on File, 1990.
Hart, James D. Concise Oxford Companion to American Literature. Oxford University Press, 1986.
Hart, James D. Oxford Companion to American Literature. 5th ed., Oxford University Press, 1983.
Hoffman, Daniel. Harvard Guide to Contemporary American Writing. Harvard University Press, 1979.
Hurwitz, Leon. Historical Dictionary of Censorship in the United States. Greenwood, 1985.
Levernier, James, Douglas R. Wilmes. American writers before 1800: A biographical and critical dictionary. Greenwood Press, 1983. .
Mainiero, Lina. American women writers: A critical reference guide from colonial times to the present. Ungar, c1979–1994. .
Marple, Alice. Iowa Authors and Their Works. Iowa State Historical Society, 1918.
Morsberger, Robert Eustis, Stephen O. Lessek, Randall Clark. American screenwriters. Gale Research, 1984. .
Ousby, Ian. Cambridge Guide to Literature in English. 2nd ed., Cambridge, 1994.
Oxford Companion to American Literature. 5th ed., Oxford, 1983.
Paneth, Donald. The Encyclopedia of American Journalism. Facts on File, 1983.
Perkins, George. Benét's Reader's Encyclopedia of American Literature. HarperCollins, 1991.
Reader's Encyclopedia of American Literature. Crowell, 1962.
Riggs, Thomas. Reference guide to American literature. St. James Press, 2000. .
Salzman, Jack. Cambridge Handbook of American Literature. Cambridge University Press, 1986.
Showalter, Elaine, Lea Baechler, A. Walton Litz. Modern American women writers. Collier Books; Maxwell Macmillan Canada; Maxwell Macmillan International, 1993. .
Smith, Jessie Carney, Shirelle Phelps. Notable black American women. Gale Research, 1992–2003. .

Unger, Leonard, A. Walton Litz, Molly Weigel. American writers: A collection of literary biographies. Scribner, 1974–. .

Australian literature 
Cambridge Guide to English Literature.Cambridge, 1983.
Gunew, Sneja Marina. A Bibliography of Australian multicultural writers. Centre for Studies in Literary Education, Humanities, Deakin University, 1992.
Oxford Companion to Australian Literature. Oxford, 1984.

Canadian literature 
Cambridge Guide to English Literature.Cambridge, 1983.
Mortiz, Albert and Theresa. Oxford Illustrated Literary Guide to Canada. Oxford, 1987.
Story, Norah. Oxford Companion to Canadian History and Literature. Oxford University Press, 1967.
Toye, William. The Oxford Companion to Canadian Literature. Oxford University Press, 1983.

Caribbean literature 
Dance, Daryl Cumber. Fifty Caribbean writers: A bio-bibliographical critical sourcebook. Greenwood Press, 1986. .
Figueredo, D. H. Encyclopedia of Caribbean literature. Greenwood Press, 2006. .

Chinese literature 
Baoliang Zhu. 20 shi ji Zhong wen zhu zuo zhe bi ming lu = Twentieth-century Chinese authors and their pen names. Guangxi shi fan da xue chu ban she, 2002. . (Chinese).

European literature 
Bédé, Jean-Albert and William Edgerton. Columbia Dictionary of Modern European Literature. 2nd ed., Columbia University Press, 1980.
Giebisch, Hans, Gustav Gugitz. Bio-bibliographisches Literaturlexikon Österreichs: Von den Anfängen bis zur Gegenwart. Brüder Hollinek, 1964.
Reader's Encyclopedia of Eastern European Literature. HarperCollins, 1993.

Albanian literature 
Dictionary of Albanian Literature. Greenwood, 1986.
Hasani, Hasan. Leksikoni i shkrimtarëve shqiptarë 1501–2001. Shtëpia Botuese Faik Konica, 2003. .

Austrian literature 
Brinker-Gabler, Gisela, Karola Ludwig, Angela Woffen. Lexikon deutschsprachiger Schriftstellerinnen, 1800–1945. Deutscher Taschenbuch Verlag, 1986. . (German).
Hardin, James N., Donald G. Daviau. Austrian fiction writers, 1875–1913. Gale Research, 1989. .
Hardin, James N., Donald G. Daviau. Austrian fiction writers after 1914. Gale Research, 1989. .

Belgian and Dutch literature

British literature 
Cambridge Guide to English Literature.Cambridge, 1983.
Davis, Gwenn, Beverly A. Joyce. Personal writings by women to 1900: A bibliography of American and British writers. University of Oklahoma Press, 1989. .
Drabble, Margaret. The Oxford Companion to English Literature. 5th ed., Oxford, 1985.
Drabble, Margaret and Jenny Stringer. Concise Oxford Companion to English Literature. Oxford, 1987.
Griffiths, Dennis. Encyclopedia of the British Press, 1440–1991. St. Martin's, 1993.
Janik, Vicki K., Del Ivan Janik, Emmanuel S. Nelson. Modern British women writers: An A-to-Z guide. Greenwood Press, 2002. .
Kanner, Barbara. Women in context: Two hundred years of British women autobiographers, a reference guide and reader. G. K. Hall; Prentice Hall International, 1997. .
Ousby, Ian. Cambridge Guide to Literature in English. 2nd ed., Cambridge, 1994.
Schlueter, Paul, June Schlueter. An encyclopedia of British women writers. Rutgers University Press, 1998. .
Scott-Kilvert, Ian, British Council. British writers. Scribner, c1979–c1984. .
Shattock, Joanne. The Oxford guide to British women writers. Oxford University Press, 1993. .
Todd, Janet M. British women writers: A critical reference guide. Continuum, 1989. .
Wynne-Davies, Marion. Prentice Hall Guide to English Literature. Prentice Hall, 1990.

Shakespeare 
Boyce, Charles. Shakespeare A to Z: The Essential Reference to His Plays, His Poems, His Life and Times, and More. Facts on File 1990.
Reader's Encyclopedia to Shakespeare. Crowell 1966.

Danish literature 
Stecher-Hansen, Marianne. Danish writers from the Reformation to decadence, 1550–1900. Thomson Gale, 2004. .
Stecher-Hansen, Marianne. Twentieth-century Danish writers. Gale Group, 1999. .

Estonian literature 
Kruus, Oskar. Eesti kirjarahva leksikon (Estnisches Schriftstellerlexikon.) Eesti Raamat, 1995. .

Finnish literature 
Suomen kirjailijat -tietokanta. Finnish Literary Society, 2004-. Available online here.

French literature 
Brosman, Catharine Savage. Nineteenth century French fiction writers: Romanticism and realism, 1800–1860. Gale Research, 1992. .
Brosman, Catharine Savage. Nineteenth-century French fiction writers: Naturalism and beyond, 1860–1900. Gale Research, 1992. .
Brosman, Catharine Savage. French novelists, 1900–1930. Gale Research, 1988. .
Brosman, Catharine Savage. French novelists, 1930–1960. Gale Research, 1988. .
Brosnan, Catharine Savage. French novelists since 1960. Gale Research, 1989. .
Cooper, Barbara T. French dramatists, 1789–1914. Gale Research, 1998. .
Dictionary of Modern French Literature. Greenwood, 1986.

Oxford Companion to French Literature. Oxford University Press, 1959.

German literature 
Brinker-Gabler, Gisela, Karola Ludwig, Angela Woffen. Lexikon deutschsprachiger Schriftstellerinnen, 1800–1945. Deutscher Taschenbuch Verlag, 1986. . (German).

Heukenkamp, Ursula, Peter Geist. Deutschsprachige Lyriker des 20. Jahrhunderts. E. Schmidt, 2007. .
Jessen, Jens Christian. Bibliographie der Autobiographien. K. G. Saur, 1987–1996. . (German).
Keith-Smith, Brian. An encyclopedia of German women writers, 1900–1933: Biographies and bibliographies with exemplary readings. E. Mellen Press, c1997–c1998. .
Kosch, Wilhelm, Bruno Berger, Heinz Rupp, Carl Ludwig Lang, Hubert Herkommer. Deutsches Literatur-Lexikon: Biograph.-bibliograph. Handbuch. Francke, 1968–. .

Oxford Companion to German Literature. Oxford University Press, 2nd ed., 1986.

German Jewish literature 
Heuer, Renate, Andrea Boelke-Fabian, Abdelhaq El Mesmoudi. Lexikon deutsch-jüdischer Autoren. Saur,|De Gruyter, 1992–2012. .

Hungarian literature 
Szinnyei, József. Magyar írók: Élete és munkái a Magyar tudományos akadémia megbizásából irta Szinnyei József . . . Hornyanszky, 1891–1914. Available online here and here.
Tezla, Albert. Hungarian authors: A bibliographical handbook. Belknap Press of Harvard University Press, 1970. .

Irish literature 
Brady, Anne, Brian Talbot Cleeve. A biographical dictionary of Irish writers. Lilliput Press, 1985. .

Dictionary of Irish Literature. Greenwood, 1979.

Iberian peninsular literature 
Dictionary of the Literature of the Iberian Peninsula. Greenwood, 1993.

Portuguese literature 
Rector, Monica, Fred M. Clark. Portuguese writers. Gale Group, 2004. .

Spanish literature 
Altisent, Martha Eulalia, Cristina Martínez-Carazo. Twentieth-century Spanish fiction writers. Thomson Gale, 2006. .
Dictionary of Spanish Literature. Greenwood, 1956.
Durán López, Fernando. Catálogo comentado de la autobiografía española, siglos XVIII y XIX. Ollero and Ramos, 1997. .
Ferreras, Juan Ignacio. Catálogo de novelas y novelistas españoles del siglo XIX. Cátedra, 1979. .
Oxford Companion to Spanish Literature. Oxford University Press, 1978.

Italian literature 
Dictionary of Italian Literature. Greenwood, 1979.
Dictionary of the Literature of the Iberian Peninsula. Greenwood, 1993.

Ferrari, Luigi. Onomasticon: Repertorio biobibliografico degli scrittori italiani dal 1501 al 1850. University of Hoepli, 1947.

Norwegian literature 
Thresher, Tanya. Twentieth-century Norwegian writers. Thomson/Gale, 2004. .

Romanian literature 
Sasu, Aurel. Dictionarul biografic al literaturii române: DBLR. Paralela 45, 2006. .

Russian literature 
Dictionary of Russian Literature. Greenwood, 1956.
Harkins, William. Dictionary of Russian Literature. Philosophical Library, 1956.
Kasack, Wolfgang. Dictionary of Russian Literature Since 1917. Columbia University Press, 1988.
Modern Encyclopedia of Russian and Soviet Literatures. Academic International Press, 1977-.
Stevanovic, Bosiljka, Vladimir Wertsman, Alexander Sumerkin. Free voices in Russian literature, 1950s-1980s: A bio-bibliographical guide. Russica Publishers, 1987. .
Terras, Victor. Handbook of Russian Literature. Yale University Press, 1985.

Scandinavian literature 
Dictionary of Scandinavian Literature. Greenwood, 1990.
The History of Nordic Women's Literature, online English version of

Danish literature

Norwegian literature

Swedish literature 
Åhlén, Bengt, Paul Harnesk. Svenskt författarlexikon; . Rabén and Sjögren, [n.d.]

Slovakian literature 
Mikula, Valér. Slovník slovenských spisovatelov. Kalligram, 2005. .

Swiss literature 
Brinker-Gabler, Gisela, Karola Ludwig, Angela Woffen. Lexikon deutschsprachiger Schriftstellerinnen, 1800–1945. Deutscher Taschenbuch Verlag, 1986. . (German).

Welsh literature 
Oxford Companion to the Literature of Wales. Oxford, 1986.

Iranian literature 
Storey, C. A. Persian literature: A bio-bibliographical survey. Luzac, 1927–.

Latin American literature 
Arellano, Jorge Eduardo. Literatura centroamericana: Diccionario de autores contemporáneos; Fuentes para su estudio. Fundación Vida, 2003. .
Foster, David William. Handbook of Latin American Literature. 2nd ed., Garland, 1992.

Brazilian literature 
Dictionary of Brazilian Literature. Greenwood, 1988.

Cuban literature 
Instituto de Literatura y Lingüística (Academia de Ciencias de Cuba). Diccionario de la literatura cubana. Editorial Letras Cubanas, 1980–1984.
Martinez, Julio A. Dictionary of Twentieth-Century Cuban Literature. Greenwood, 1990.

Ecuadorian literature 
Neto, Paulo de Carvalho. Diccionario del folklore ecuatoriano. Editorial Casa de la Cultura Ecuatoriana, 2001. .

Guyanese literature 
National History & Arts Council. Dictionary of Guyanese folklore. National History & Arts Council, 1975.

Mexican literature 
Dictionary of Mexican Literature. Greenwood, 1992.

Uruguayan literature 
Oreggioni, Alberto F., Ediciones de la Banda Oriental. Nuevo diccionario de literatura uruguaya, 2001. A. Oreggioni; Ediciones de la Banda Oriental, [2001]. .

Venezuelan literature 
Dugarte, Rafael Angel Rivas, Gladys García Riera, Francisco Javier Pérez. Quiénes escriben en Venezuela: Diccionario de escritores venezolanos; Siglos XVIII a XXI. Caracas [Venezuela], 2006.

Middle Eastern literature 
Al-Mallah, Majd Yaser, Coeli Fitzpatrick. Twentieth-century Arab writers. Gale Cengage Learning, 2009. .

Turkish literature 
Işık, İhsan. Encyclopedia of Turkish authors: People of literature, culture, and science. Elvan, 2005. .

Oriental literature 
Prošek, Jaroslav. Dictionary of Oriental Literatures. Basic Books, 1975.

Japanese literature 
Fairbanks, Carol. Japanese women fiction writers: Their culture and society, 1890s to 1990s: English language sources. Scarecrow Press, 2002. .
Gessel, Van C. Japanese fiction writers, 1868–1945. Gale Research, 1997. .
Lewell, John. Modern Japanese novelists: A biographical dictionary. Kodansha International, 1993. .
Miner, Earl. Princeton Companion to Classical Japanese Literature. Princeton University Press, 1985.
Odagiri, Susumu. Nihon kindai bungaku daijiten. Nihon Kindai Bungakukan, Tokyo [1977-1978].

South Asian literature 
Sanga, Jaina C. South Asian novelists in English: An A-to-Z guide. Greenwood Press, 2003. .

Indian literature 
Encyclopedia of Indian Literature. Sahitya Akademi, 1987-.

New Zealand literature 
Cambridge Guide to English Literature.Cambridge, 1983.

Authors 

Behn, Wolfgang. Concise biographical companion to index Islamicus: An international who's who in Islamic studies from its beginnings down to the twentieth century: Bio-bibliographical supplement to index Islamicus, 1665–1980. Brill, 2004–2006. .
Combs, Richard E., Nancy R. Owen. Authors: Critical and biographical references. Scarecrow Press, 1993. .
Contemporary authors online. Gale Research, 1995-. Available online here.

Kunitz, Stanley, Howard Haycraft. Twentieth century authors. H. W. Wilson, 1942.

Chinese authors 
Moran, Thomas. Chinese fiction writers, 1900–1949. Thomson Gale, 2007. .

Icelandic authors 
Stevens, Patrick J. Icelandic writers. Thomson Gale, 2004. .

Japanese writers 
Carter, Steven D. Medieval Japanese writers. Gale Research, 1999. .
Gessel, Van C. Japanese fiction writers since World War II. Gale Research, 1997. .

Norwegian authors

Turkish authors 
Mitler, Louis. Ottoman Turkish writers: A bibliographical dictionary of significant figures in pre-Republican Turkish literature. P. Lang, 1988. .

Biography and autobiography 
Jessen, Jens Christian. Bibliographie der Autobiographien. K. G. Saur, 1987–1996. . (German).
Kanner, Barbara. Women in context: Two hundred years of British women autobiographers, a reference guide and reader. G. K. Hall; Prentice Hall International, 1997. .
Matthews, William. British autobiographies: An annotated bibliography of British autobiographies published or written before 1951. University of California Press, 1955.
Wynar, Bohdan S. ARBA guide to biographical dictionaries. Libraries Unlimited, 1986. .

Censorship 
Green, Jonathon. The Encyclopedia of Censorship. Facts on File, 1990.
Haight, Anne Lyon. Banned Books, 387 B.C. to 1978 A.D.. 4th ed., Bowker, 1978.
Harer, John B. Intellectual Freedom: A Reference Handbook. ABC-Clio, 1992.
Hurwitz, Leon. Historical Dictionary of Censorship in the United States. Greenwood, 1985.

Children's literature 
Carpenter, Humphrey & Mari Prichard. The Oxford Companion to Children's Literature. Oxford University Press, 1984.
Carruth, Gorton. Young Reader's Companion. Bowker, 1993.
Gale Research, Thomson Gale. Something about the author. Gale Research, 1971–. ISSN 0276-816X.
La Beau, Dennis, Adele Sarkissian, Joyce Nakamura. Children's authors and illustrators: An index to biographical dictionaries. Gale Research, 1976–. ISSN 1082-7390.
Pendergast, Sara, Tom Pendergast, Margaret Mahy. St. James guide to children's writers. St. James Press, 1999. .
Stott, Jon C. Children's Literature from A to Z: A Guide for Parents and Teachers. McGraw-Hill, 1984.
Wyatt, Flora R., Margaret Coggins, Jane Hunter Imber. Popular nonfiction authors for children: A biographical and thematic guide. Libraries Unlimited, 1998. .

Classical literature 
Howatson, M. C. The Oxford Companion to Classical Literature. 2nd ed., Oxford, 1989.

Drama 
Hochman, Stanley. McGraw-Hill Encyclopedia of World Drama: An International Reference Work. 2nd ed., McGraw-Hill, 1984.
Shipley, Joseph. Crown Guide to the World's Great Plays. Rev. ed., Crown, 1984.

Epics and romances

Gothic 
Thomson, Douglass H., Jack G. Voller, Frederick S. Frank. Gothic writers: A critical and bibliographical guide. Greenwood Press, 2002. .

Historical fiction 
Vasudevan, Aruna, Lesley Henderson. Twentieth-century romance and historical writers. St. James Press, 1994. .

Historiography 
Woolf, D. R., Kathryn M. Brammall, Greg Bak. A global encyclopedia of historical writing. Garland, 1998. .

Journalism 
Applegate, Edd. Literary journalism: A biographical dictionary of writers and editors. Greenwood Press, 1996. .
Connors, Tracy Daniel. Longman dictionary of mass media and communication. Longman, 1982. .
Drost, Harry. The world's news media: A comprehensive reference guide. Longman Group, 1991. .
Griffiths, Dennis. The encyclopedia of the British press, 1422–1992. St. Martin's Press, 1992. .
Johnston, Donald H. Encyclopedia of international media and communications. Academic Press, 2003. .
Quick, Amanda C. World press encyclopedia: A survey of press systems worldwide. Gale, 2003. .
Taft, William H. Encyclopedia of twentieth-century journalists. Garland, 1986. .
Weiner, Richard. Webster's New World dictionary of media and communications. Macmillan, 1996. .

American journalism 
Ashley, Perry J. American newspaper journalists, 1873–1900. Gale Research, 1983. .
Ashley, Perry J. American newspaper publishers, 1950–1990. Gale Research, 1993. .
Krul, Arthur J. American literary journalists, 1945–1995. Gale Research, 1997. .
McKerns, Joseph P. Biographical dictionary of American journalism. Greenwood Press, 1989. .
Paneth, Donald. The encyclopedia of American journalism. Facts on File, Inc., 1983. .
Riley, Sam G. American magazine journalists, 1741–1850. Gale Research, 1988. .
Riley, Sam. G. Biographical dictionary of American newspaper columnists. Greenwood Press, 1995. .
Vaughn, Stephen L. Encyclopedia of American journalism. Routledge, 2008. .
Wynar, Lubomyr Roman, Anna T. Wynar. Encyclopedic directory of ethnic newspapers and periodicals in the United States. Libraries Unlimited, 1976. .
Wynar, Lubomyr Roman. Guide to the American ethnic press: Slavic and East European newspapers and periodicals. Center for the Study of Ethnic Publications, School of Library Science, Kent State University, 1986.

Literary characters and plots 
Amos, William. The Originals: An A-Z of Fiction's Real-Life Characters. Little, Brown, 1985.
Franklin, Benjamin V. Dictionary of American Literary Characters. Facts on File, 1989.
Freeman, William. Dictionary of Fictional Characters. Rev. ed., The Writer, 1992.
Harris, Laurie. Characters in 20th Century Literature. Gale, 1990.
Howes, Kelly King. Characters in 19th Century Literature. Gale, 1992.
Magill, Frank N. Cyclopedia of Literary Characters. Salem Press, 1963.
Magill, Frank N. Cyclopedia of Literary Characters II. Salem Press, 1990.
Magill, Frank N. Masterplots. Rev. ed., Salem Press, 1976.
Magill, Frank N. Masterplots II. Salem Press, 1986–90.
Pringle, David. Imaginary People: A Who's Who of Modern Fictional Characters. World Almanac, 1987.

Literary criticism 
Coyle, Martin. Encyclopedia of Literature and Criticism. Gale, 1991.
Harris, Wendell V. Dictionary of Concepts in Literary Criticism and Theory. Greenwood, 1992.

Magazines 
Riley, Sam G. Magazines of the American South. Greenwood Press, 1986. .
Wynar, Lubomyr Roman, Anna T. Wynar. Encyclopedic directory of ethnic newspapers and periodicals in the United States. Libraries Unlimited, 1976. .
Wynar, Lubomyr Roman. Guide to the American ethnic press: Slavic and East European newspapers and periodicals. Center for the Study of Ethnic Publications, School of Library Science, Kent State University, 1986.

Novels 
Contemporary novelists. St. James Press; St. Martin's Press, 1972–. ISSN 1531-2232.

Poetry 
Heukenkamp, Ursula, Peter Geist. Deutschsprachige Lyriker des 20. Jahrhunderts. E. Schmidt, 2007. .
O'Donoughue, D. J. The poets of Ireland: A biographical and bibliographical dictionary of Irish writers of English verse. Hodges, Figgis and Company, 1912.
Preminger, Alex and T. V. F. Brogan. The New Princeton Encyclopedia of Poetry and Poetics. 3rd ed., Princeton University Press, 1993.
Stewart, William. British and Irish poets: a biographical dictionary, 449-2006. McFarland, 2007. .

Printing and Publishing 

Feather, John. Dictionary of Book History. Oxford University Press, 1987.

Glaister, Geoffrey. Glaister's Glossary of the Book. 2nd ed., University of California Press, 1980.
Kurian, George Thomas. Encyclopedia of Publishing and the Book Arts. Holt, 1994.

Romance fiction 
Vasudevan, Aruna, Lesley Henderson. Twentieth-century romance and historical writers. St. James Press, 1994. .

Science fiction 
Clute, John and Peter Nicholls. Encyclopedia of Science Fiction. St. Martin's, 1993.
Gunn, James. The New Encyclopedia of Science Fiction. Viking-Penguin, 1988.

Spy fiction 
McCormick, Donald, Katy Fletcher. Spy fiction: A connoisseur's guide. Facts on File, 1990. .

20th century literature 
Harris, Laurie. Characters in 20th Century Literature. Gale, 1990.
Klein, Leonard S. Encyclopedia of World Literature in the 20th Century. 2nd ed., Continuum Publishing Group, 1981–83.
Martinez, Julio A. Dictionary of Twentieth-Century Cuban Literature. Greenwood, 1990.
Seymour-Smith, Martin. New Guide to Modern World Literature. HarperCollins, 1985.
Vasudevan, Aruna, Lesley Henderson. Twentieth-century romance and historical writers. St. James Press, 1994. .
Baoliang Zhu. 20 shi ji Zhong wen zhu zuo zhe bi ming lu = Twentieth-century Chinese authors and their pen names. Guangxi shi fan da xue chu ban she, 2002. . (Chinese).

Women's literature 
Banks, Olive. The biographical dictionary of British feminists. New York University Press, 1985–1990. .
Blain, Virginia. Feminist Companion to Literature in English: Women Writers from the Middle Ages to the Present. Yale University Press, 1990.
Boynton, Victoria, Jo Malin, Emmanuel S. Nelson. Encyclopedia of women's autobiography. Greenwood Press, 2005. .
Buck, Claire. The Bloomsbury Guide to Women's Literature. Prentice Hall, 1992.
Davis, Gwenn, Beverly A. Joyce. Personal writings by women to 1900: A bibliography of American and British writers. University of Oklahoma Press, 1989. .
 Searchable online English-language version History of Nordic Women's Literature
Kanner, Barbara. Women in context: Two hundred years of British women autobiographers, a reference guide and reader. G. K. Hall; Prentice Hall International, 1997. .
Keith-Smith, Brian. An encyclopedia of German women writers, 1900–1933: Biographies and bibliographies with exemplary readings. E. Mellen Press, c1997–c1998. .
Miller, Jane Eldridge. Who's who in contemporary women's writing. Routledge, 2002. .
Smith, Jessie Carney, Shirelle Phelps. Notable black American women. Gale Research, 1992–2003. .
Todd, Janet M. A dictionary of British and American women writers, 1660–1800. Rowman and Allanheld, 1985. .

Proverbs

References 

Literature
Encyclopedias of literature